The women's 1000 metres speed skating event was part of the speed skating at the 1960 Winter Olympics programme. It was the first appearance of women's speed skating events at the Olympics. The competition was held on the Squaw Valley Olympic Skating Rink and for the first time at the Olympics on artificially frozen ice. It was held on Monday, February 22, 1960. Twenty-two speed skaters from ten nations competed.

Medalists

Records
These were the standing world and Olympic records (in minutes) prior to the 1960 Winter Olympics.

(*) The record was set in a high altitude venue (more than 1000 metres above sea level) and on naturally frozen ice.

Klara Guseva set the first Olympic record with 1:34.1 minutes.

Results

References

External links
Official Olympic Report
 

Women's speed skating at the 1960 Winter Olympics
Olymp
Skat